Norman Kay (August 11, 1927 – January 17, 2002) was an American bridge player. He partnered Sidney Silodor until Silodor's death in 1963. With Edgar Kaplan, Kay formed one of the most successful and longest-lasting partnerships in organized bridge. It spanned more than 40 years, and ended with Kaplan's death in 1997. He was from Narberth, Pennsylvania.

In 1955, Kay won the McKenney Trophy (now the Barry Crane Top 500) for earning the greatest number of masterpoints in American Contract Bridge League-sanctioned play during the year. Kay won 13 major North American Bridge Championships (NABC) in the period of 1957–1977, when he was named ACBL's top performance player. He was runner-up in the Bermuda Bowl twice (1961 and 1967), and was second (1968) and third (1960) in the World Team Olympiad. He was a World Bridge Federation World Life Master and an ACBL Grand Life Master. Kay was arguably the greatest bridge player who never became a world champion. He was known for both the remarkable accuracy of his card play and for his even temperament at the table. Away from the table, he was widely respected as an exceptionally kind and humble gentleman.
According to Alan Truscott, Kay "bent over backward to avoid criticizing his partner, or his opponents, blaming himself for any misfortune if he possibly could." He also played slowly: "Kay believed in a thorough analysis at the table, and never played a card until he had examined every angle. This leisurely approach occasionally caused problems."

Kay was an account executive for Merrill Lynch for 38 years, retiring as a vice president in 1987. He helped his wife who operated a sports memorabilia business from 1980 to 1997. He and his wife, Judy, also owned a stable of standardbreds (trotters and pacers) from 1970 or 1980 to 1986 or 1987. Kay died from a pulmonary embolism on January 17, 2002. Judy Kay subsequently married Bobby Wolff in late 2003.

Kay was Inducted into the ACBL Hall of Fame in 1996.

Bridge accomplishments

Honors
 ACBL Hall of Fame, 1996
 ACBL Honorary Member of the Year 2001

Awards
 McKenney Trophy 1955
 Mott-Smith Trophy 1960, 1963, 1968

Wins
 North American Bridge Championships (27)
 Vanderbilt (7) 1959, 1960, 1968, 1970, 1981, 1983, 1986
 Spingold (2) 1967, 1968
 Chicago (now Reisinger) (1) 1961
 Reisinger (7) 1966, 1967, 1971, 1982, 1983, 1984, 1990
 Men's Board-a-Match Teams (3) 1955, 1961, 1966
 Jacoby Open Swiss Teams (1) 1997
 Blue Ribbon Pairs (1) 1974
 Life Master Men's Pairs (1) 1973
 Open Pairs (2) 1963, 1966
 Men's Pairs, Spring NABC (1) 1958
 Master Individual (1) 1955

Runners-up
 Bermuda Bowl (2) 1961, 1967
 World Open Team Olympiad (1) 1968
 North American Bridge Championships (21)
 Vanderbilt (3) 1958, 1965, 1994
 Spingold (5) 1960, 1961, 1965, 1971, 1978
 Reisinger (1) 1969
 Men's Board-a-Match Teams (3) 1958, 1963, 1975
 Jacoby Open Swiss Teams (1) 1991
 Master Mixed Teams (3) 1960, 1962, 1967
 Fall National Open Pairs (1) 1956
 Men's Pairs (3) 1958, 1965, 1970
 Men's Pairs, Spring NABC (1) 1962
 United States Bridge Championships (5)
 Open Team Trials (4) 1971, 1984, 1986, 1992
 Open Pair Trials (1) 1966

References

External links
 
 

1927 births
2002 deaths
American contract bridge players
Bermuda Bowl players
American stockbrokers
People from Narberth, Pennsylvania
Deaths from pulmonary embolism
Place of birth missing